Misefa is a small village in the Zala Hills of Hungary. It is located 15 km from Keszthely and 30 km from Zalaegerszeg.

History
Misefa was first mentioned in documents as Myxefolva (in 1352), but it has existed since the 13th century. According to a local legend the name (from "mise", meaning mass, and "fa", meaning tree) originates from the fact that the village didn't have a church and masses were held under the branches of a walnut tree.

Tourist sights
 Old manor (now a hotel)
 Fish pond surrounded by a park

External links 
 Official site of Misefa
 Street map 

Populated places in Zala County